The Emsian is one of three faunal stages in the Early Devonian Epoch. It lasted from 407.6 ± 2.6 million years ago to 393.3 ± 1.2 million years ago. It was preceded by the Pragian Stage and followed by the Eifelian Stage. It is named after the Ems river in Germany.

In North America the Emsian Stage is represented by Sawkill or Sawkillian time.

Biological events 

During this period, earliest known agoniatitid ammonoid fossils began appearing within this stage after first appearing in previous stage and began to evolutionarily radiate within this stage, in which a new ammonoid order Goniatitida rises in the end of Zlichovian stage (Siberian representation; corresponds to early Eifelian and after the end of Early Devonian, before 391.9 mya). Later agoniatitid ammonoids would die out in the Taghanic event in the upper middle Givetian. Goniatite ammonoids would give rise to further ammonoid orders, thus starting ammonoid dominance of marine fossils in further periods until their end at the Cretaceous-Paleogene mass extinction event.

References 

 
Early Devonian